Lake Lindsey is an unincorporated community and census-designated place (CDP) in Hernando County, Florida, United States. The population was 71 at the 2010 census.

Geography
Lake Lindsey is located in northeastern Hernando County at  (28.633622, -82.362324), on the northeastern side of the small lake of the same name.

Demographics

As of the census of 2000, there were 49 people, 23 households, and 12 families residing in the CDP. The racial makeup of the CDP was 100.00% White.

There were 23 households, out of which 30.4% had children under the age of 18 living with them, 34.8% were married couples living together, 17.4% had a female householder with no husband present, and 43.5% were non-families. 34.8% of all households were made up of individuals, and 13.0% had someone living alone who was 65 years of age or older. The average household size was 2.13 and the average family size was 2.62.

In the CDP, the population was spread out, with 26.5% under the age of 18, 2.0% from 18 to 24, 32.7% from 25 to 44, 26.5% from 45 to 64, and 12.2% who were 65 years of age or older. The median age was 40 years. For every 100 females, there were 88.5 males. For every 100 females age 18 and over, there were 71.4 males.

The median income for a household in the CDP was $25,192, and the median income for a family was $18,750. Males had a median income of $0 versus $8,750 for females. The per capita income for the CDP was $10,314. There were no families and 15.9% of the population living below the poverty line, including no under eighteens and none of those over 64.

References

Census-designated places in Hernando County, Florida
Unincorporated communities in Hernando County, Florida